Beau Purple (foaled in 1957) was an American Thoroughbred racehorse. He is most famous for defeating the champion gelding Kelso and champion colt Carry Back in three of their four meetings.

Background
He was trained by George P. Odom until mid 1962, when H. Allen Jerkens, a 1975 inductee into the U.S. Racing Hall of Fame, took over. Beau Purple was the first horse ever bred by Hobeau Farm of Wall Street mutual-fund developer Jack Dreyfus.

Racing career
After winning the 1960 Derby Trial Stakes, Beau Purple was withdrawn from the Kentucky Derby as a result of a sore left front shin. This injury kept him out of the U.S. Triple Crown series and severely limited his racing for nearly two years. He ran only four times in 1961, but had his best year at age five in 1962. Among his major wins, Beau Purple set a new track record at Belmont Park for the  miles distance in defeating Kelso in the 1962 Man o' War Stakes, and he twice broke the track record for a mile and a quarter on dirt at Aqueduct Racetrack in winning both the 1962 Suburban Handicap and Brooklyn Handicap. In February 1963, Beau Purple beat Kelso for the third time, making it three of four wins over Kelso in his career, when he won the Widener Handicap at Hialeah Park Race Track in Florida.

Pedigree

References

 Sources
 Beau Purple's pedigree and partial racing stats, PedigreeQuery.com.

1957 racehorse births
1974 racehorse deaths
Racehorses bred in Kentucky
Racehorses trained in the United States
Thoroughbred family 8-c